The Beyik Pass, also written and Payik Pass and Bayik Pass, is a mountain pass in the Sarikol Range between Gorno-Badakhshan Autonomous Province in Tajikistan and the Taghdumbash Pamir region of Tashkurgan Tajik Autonomous County in Xinjiang, China. There is an ethnic Kyrgyz village on the Chinese side with the same name, though the village is more commonly referred to by a different name in Chinese and Beyik is reserved for the border guard outpost.

History 

Some Chinese historians argue that Xuanzang, the Chinese Buddhist whose pilgrimage to India inspired the novel Journey to the West, used this path on his way to India.

That path is in the historic region of Badakhshan. In the 1890s, the Chinese, Russian, and Afghan governments signed a series of agreements that divided Badakhshan, but China contested the result of the division. The dispute was eventually settled in 2002 when Tajikistan and China signed a border agreement.

The path is difficult to traverse all year round. It is snow covered during the winter months. The snow persists until May. During the summer months, the melting causes the streams to overflow. The entire Chalachigu Valley on the Chinese side is closed to visitors; however, local residents and herders from the area are permitted to access.

See also
 China–Tajikistan border
 Tegermansu Pass 
 Wakhjir Pass 
 Kilik Pass 
 Mintaka Pass 
 Chalachigu Valley 
 Afghanistan–China border 
 China–Pakistan border

References 

Mountain passes of China
Mountain passes of Tajikistan
Mountain passes of Xinjiang
China–Tajikistan border
Mountain passes of the Pamir
Sites along the Silk Road
Tashkurgan Tajik Autonomous County